Gentiane Lupi (born 26 October 1975, Wellington, New Zealand) is a New Zealand professional boxer, kickboxer, MMA and Muay Thai fighter. Lupi is also the former Women's International Boxing Association World super bantamweight champion and also the third New Zealand born person to have held a world boxing title. Lupi currently holds the WBA Oceania Super Featherweight Title.

Lupi has starred in such  films such as Eagle vs Shark, Kombi Nation, Second Hand Wedding and Krampus as well as the TV series Nothing Trivial. Since debuting in 2013, Lupi has won seven titles in all fighting styles including a boxing world title. In 2016 Lupi stated she has been training with MTI Wellington for nearly three years.

Filmography

Combat Titles

Kickboxing
Tournament 
Four Women King in the Ring Tournament Winner (2014)
Four Women Adrenaline Tournament Winner (2014)
World Mauy Thai Council
WMC New Zealand Welterweight Title (2014)
WMC New Zealand Light Welterweight Title (2016)
World Kickboxing Federation
WKBF New Zealand Middleweight Title (2015)
WKBF New Zealand Light Welterweight Title (2016)
WKBF World Featherweight Title (2017)

Boxing
New Zealand Professional Boxing Association
NZPBA Women's Lightweight Title (2014)
Women's International Boxing Association
WIBA World Super Bantamweight Title 
World Boxing Association
WBA Oceania Super Featherweight Title (2016)

Professional MMA record

| style="text-align:center;" colspan="8"|1 Wins (1 knockouts, 0 decisions, 0 Submissions), 1 Losses (0 knockouts, 1 decisions, 0 Submissions), 0 Draws
|-  style="text-align:center; background:#e3e3e3;"
|  style="border-style:none none solid solid; "|Res.
|  style="border-style:none none solid solid; "|Record
|  style="border-style:none none solid solid; "|Opponent
|  style="border-style:none none solid solid; "|Type
|  style="border-style:none none solid solid; "|Rd., Time
|  style="border-style:none none solid solid; "|Date
|  style="border-style:none none solid solid; "|Location
|  style="border-style:none none solid solid; "|Notes
|- align=center
|Lose
|1–1
|align=left| Hera Tha Nytmere 
|
|
|
|align=left|
|align=left| 
|- align=center
|Win
|1–0
|align=left|  Alex Sorthis 
|
|
|
|align=left|
|align=left|

Professional kickboxing/Muay Thai record

| style="text-align:center;" colspan="8"|19 Wins, 4 Losses, 0 Draws
|-  style="text-align:center; background:#e3e3e3;"
|  style="border-style:none none solid solid; "|Res.
|  style="border-style:none none solid solid; "|Record
|  style="border-style:none none solid solid; "|Opponent
|  style="border-style:none none solid solid; "|Type
|  style="border-style:none none solid solid; "|Rd., Time
|  style="border-style:none none solid solid; "|Date
|  style="border-style:none none solid solid; "|Location
|  style="border-style:none none solid solid; "|Notes
|- align=center
|Win
|19–4
|align=left|Demi McNamara
|
|
|
|align=left|
|align=left|
|- align=center
|Lose
|18–4
|align=left|Lucy Payne 
|
|
|
|align=left|
|
|- align=center
|Win
|18–3 
|align=left|Katie Quick 
|
|
|
|align=left|
|align=left|
|- align=center
|Win
|17–3
|align=left|Desiree Maaka 
|
|
|
|align=left|
|align=left|
|- align=center
|Win
|16–3
|align=left|Missy Elliot   
|
|
|
|align=left|
|align=left|
|- align=center
|Lose
|15–3
|align=left|Daria Smith    
|
|
|
|align=left|
|align=left|
|- align=center
|Win
|15–2
|align=left|Natalier Teller   
|
|
|
|align=left|
|align=left|
|- align=center
|Lose
|14–2
|align=left|Carleigh Crawford    
|
|
|
|align=left|
|align=left|
|- align=center
|Win
|14–1
|align=left|Natalier Teller  
|
|
|
|align=left|
|align=left|
|- align=center
|Win
|13–1
|align=left|Emma Graham  
|
|
|
|align=left|
|align=left|
|- align=center
|Win
|12–1
|align=left|Alicia Pestana  
|
|
|
|align=left|
|align=left|
|- align=center
|Win
|11–1
|align=left|Daria Smith  
|
|
|
|align=left|
|align=left|
|- align=center
|Win
|10–1
|align=left|Baby Nansen  
|
|
|
|align=left|
|align=left|
|- align=center
|Win
|9–1
|align=left|Tui Pirikahu  
|
|
|
|align=left|
|align=left|
|- align=center
|Win
|8–1
|align=left|Rochelle Stroh  
|
|
|
|align=left|
|align=left| 
|- align=center
|Win
|7–1
|align=left|Amy Vaughen  
|
|
|
|align=left|
|align=left| 
|- align=center
|Lose
|6–1
|align=left|Baby Nansen 
|
|
|
|align=left|
|align=left|
|- align=center
|Win
|6–0
|align=left|Beathe Kornelison  
|
|
|
|align=left|
|align=left| 
|- align=center
|Win
|5–0
|align=left|Rose Te Hau 
|
|
|
|align=left|
|align=left|
|- align=center
|Win
|4–0
|align=left|Ari MacDonald 
|
|
|
|align=left|
|align=left|
|- align=center
|Win
|3–0
|align=left|Jo LoFroth 
|
|
|
|align=left|
|align=left|
|- align=center
|Win
|2–0
|align=left|Bridget Lord  
|
|
|
|align=left|
|align=left| 
|- align=center
|Win
|1–0
|align=left|Ramona Sargent 
|
|
|
|align=left|
|align=left|

Professional boxing record

|-  style="text-align:center; background:#e3e3e3;"
|  style="border-style:none none solid solid; "|Res.
|  style="border-style:none none solid solid; "|Record
|  style="border-style:none none solid solid; "|Opponent
|  style="border-style:none none solid solid; "|Type
|  style="border-style:none none solid solid; "|Rd., Time
|  style="border-style:none none solid solid; "|Date
|  style="border-style:none none solid solid; "|Location
|  style="border-style:none none solid solid; "|Notes
|- align=center
|Win
|6-3-1
|align=left| Karen Te Ruki Pasene
|
|
|
|align=left|
|align=left|
|- align=center
|Win
|5-3-1
|align=left| Nurshahidah Roslie
|
|
|
|align=left|
|align=left|
|- align=center
|Lose
|4-3-1
|align=left| Deanha Hobbs
|
|
|
|align=left|
|align=left|
|- align=center
|Lose
|4-2-1
|align=left| Ronica Jeffrey
|
|
|
|align=left|
|align=left|
|- align=center
|Win
|4-1-1
|align=left| Anrey Onesongchaigym
|
|
|
|align=left|
|align=left|

|-
|Win
|3-1-1
|align=left| Baby Nansen
|
|
|
|align=left|
|align=left|
|-
|Win
|2-1-1
|align=left| Daniella Smith
|
|
|
|align=left|
|align=left|

|-
|Win
|1-1-1
|align=left| Daniella Smith
|
|
|
|align=left|
|align=left|
|-
|style="background:#abcdef;"|Draw
|0-1-1
|align=left| Leighann Banham
|
|
|
|align=left|
|align=left|
|-
|Lose
|0–1
|align=left|  Shannon O'Connell 
|
|
|
|align=left|
|align=left|
|-

Awards and recognitions
2019 Gladrap Boxing Awards Female Boxer of the Year (Nominated)
2019 Gladrap Boxing Awards Returning Boxer of the Year (Nominated)

References

External links
Newzealandfighter.co.nz
Awakeningfighters.com

|-

|-

|-

1975 births
Living people
New Zealand women boxers
New Zealand female kickboxers
New Zealand world boxing champions
Sportspeople from Wellington City
Actresses from Wellington City
21st-century New Zealand actresses
New Zealand professional boxing champions
New Zealand film actresses
New Zealand female mixed martial artists
Mixed martial artists utilizing boxing